Fojia is a monotypic genus of skinks: the sole species  is Fojia bumui, also known as the fojia skink. It is endemic to New Guinea where it is restricted to the Morobe Province on the northern coast of Papua New Guinea.

References

Skinks
Skinks of New Guinea
Endemic fauna of Papua New Guinea
Monotypic lizard genera
Taxa named by Allen Eddy Greer
Taxa named by Martin Simon (herpetologist)